Shimolino is a rural locality (a selo) and the administrative center of Shimolinsky Selsoviet, Blagoveshchensky District, Altai Krai, Russia. The population was 828 as of 2013. There are 9 streets.

Geography 
Mikhaylovka is the nearest rural locality.

References 

Rural localities in Blagoveshchensky District, Altai Krai